Nectria peziza or yellow spot is an ascomycete fungus with bright yellow to orange globose fruiting bodies (0.2 – 0.4 mm across) found on rotting polypores, well rotted deadwood, bark, dung, and decaying cloth. Its globular fruiting bodies (peritheca), quite large for the genus, may be isolated or crowded; they have a slightly prominent black dot at the top, the ostiolum, this being the entrance to the inner cavity; the bodies often collapse into a cup-shape when dry and the colour fades to pale yellow or whitish.

Synonyms 
This fungus has an unusually large number of previous binomials, such as – 
Sphaeria peziza (1791); Hydropisphaera peziza (1822); Dialonectria peziza (1884); Cucurbitaria peziza (1898); Neuronectria peziza (1957); Byssonectria bryophila (1985); Sphaeria aurea (1823); Nectria aurea (1879); Dialonectria aurea (1884); Cucurbitaria aurea (1898); Byssonectria epigaea; and Nectria epigaea (1879).

Classification 
Nectra peziza belongs to the order Hypocreales within the class Sordariomycetes, usually recognized by their brightly coloured (usually red, orange or yellow), perithecial ascomata, or spore-producing structures.

Distribution 
Nectria peziza has been recorded from Africa (Seychelles); Asia (Japan, Pakistan); Caribbean Islands (Bermuda); Europe (Denmark, Germany); North America (USA, Canada); and New Zealand. It is recorded as growing on a wide range of tree species. In the British Isles it has a wide range of distribution and has been found in England, Northern Ireland, Wales and Scotland. N. peziza has even been found in Antarctica, growing in the Windmill Island group.

See also 
 Nectria cinnabarina - a closely related and more common species.

References

Notes

Sources 
 Phillips, Roger (2006), Mushrooms. London : MacMillan, .

External links 
 The Virtual Field Guide.
 The National Biodiversity Network Gateway.

Fungi of Europe
Fungal plant pathogens and diseases
peziza
Fungi described in 1849
Fungi of Seychelles